Maalaala Mo Kaya (abbreviated MMK), also known as Memories in English, is a Philippine anthology series, which was first aired on May 15, 1991. MMK is the longest-running drama anthology on Philippine television. However due to franchise renewal controversy over the network giant ABS-CBN, it shown limitedly on Kapamilya Channel, Kapamilya Online Live, A2Z Channel 11, and on iWant TFC and Official YouTube channel of ABS-CBN Entertainment. This is the 30th and final season that will produce after the announcement by the host which announced on 19th November 2022.

Episodes

References 

2022 Philippine television seasons
Maalaala Mo Kaya